The Iran national rugby sevens team first took part in the 2009 Carlton Sevens in Colombo, Sri Lanka. Playing three matches, they lost all three, against Japan, Kazakhstan and Pakistan respectively.

Results

2009

2010

 Iran wins in bold.

References

Rugby union in Iran
National rugby sevens teams
Rugby